Notes from the Archive: Recordings 2011–2016 is the first compilation album by American singer-songwriter Maggie Rogers. It was released digitally by Rogers' imprint Debay Sounds on December 18, 2020, and released on CD and vinyl on April 23, 2021. 

The 16-track collection consists of various songs written and recorded before her breakthrough hit "Alaska" was released in 2016. It is split into four parts: her 2016 rock EP, the 2014 demo Blood Ballet, her work with the Del Water Gap, and the 2012 demo The Echo.

Critical reception
Heather Phares, writing for AllMusic, praised the songs from Blood Ballet and Rogers' songwriting but said that "One More Afternoon" and "Together" "sound a little cluttered compared to the compilation's later tracks".

Track listing

Personnel
Musicians
Maggie Rogers – lead vocals, guitar
Nicholas Das – guitar
Andrew Campbell – guitar
Dan Hemerlein – bass
S. Holden Jaffe – lead vocals, guitar

Technical
Maggie Rogers – mixer
Chris Allgood – mastering engineer
Aaron Bastinelli – engineer
Jeff Fettig – engineer, mixer
Kurt Goebel – mixer
Peter Hoopes – engineer
Andre Kelman – engineer
Emily Lazar – mastering engineer
Pablo Melendez – engineer, mixer
Jason. Moss – engineer
Jake Rodenhouse – mastering engineer
Alex Ryaboy – engineer
Douglas Schadt – mastering engineer, mixer
Damien Wiseman – engineer
Veronica Wyman – engineer

Charts

References

2020 compilation albums
Maggie Rogers albums
Indie folk compilation albums